Jérôme Bignon (born 1 January 1949) is a member of the National Assembly of France. He represents the Somme department, and is a member of the Union for a Popular Movement.

References

1949 births
Living people
People from Neuilly-sur-Seine
Politicians from Île-de-France
Union for a Popular Movement politicians
The Republicans (France) politicians
Agir (France) politicians
Deputies of the 10th National Assembly of the French Fifth Republic
Deputies of the 12th National Assembly of the French Fifth Republic
Deputies of the 13th National Assembly of the French Fifth Republic
French Senators of the Fifth Republic
Senators of Somme (department)